Pallagrello is a synonym for several Italian wine grape varieties including:

Coda di Volpe
Pallagrello bianco
Pallagrello nero